Dimitrios Votsis (Greek: Δημήτριος Βότσης; 1841 – 28 October 1917) was a Greek politician and a mayor of Patras.  His family is descended from Paramythia in Thesprotia in Epirus.  He was the son of Athanasios and daughter of Eleni Votsi, they were the first settlers of the city after their battle for an independent Greece was lost in Epirus.  He studied law and later became a judge in Patras.

Career 
In 1891, he was elected to the municipal council and became a president.  Four years later, he was elected with the coalition of Achilleas Gerokostopoulos.  He was elected mayor of Patras in 1899 which he was also voted in, in another two elections, in 1903 and 1907.  His last service was in 1914 due to the Balkan Wars.  With the dissolution of his services, he stopped running for mayor.

Accomplishments 
During his tenure the Cathedral of Saint Andrew started being constructed, after he, as an MP, proposed the project to parliament, and, in 1908, it was founded in the presence of King George I. He founded the public butcheries at Akti Dymaion, he bought the modern municipal council building for 121,000 drachmas, he ran the poorhouse in Akti Dymaion, he built several neighbourhoods of the city, constructed a new tank in Kastro which still runs today, a new water tower other than the  12 km in length.  He bought a few barracks in Synora which still exist, he guarded the appearance of the city's tree planted squares, he measured the public, paving of roads in which before they were earthend and lead into Olga Square. He brought electricity to the city in 1902 and constructed a gaslight factory in Krya Ition and added its first lampposts in Georgiou I Square and in Maizonos Street, also he brought the tram in Patras which positioned by the railroad which had a streetcar, streetcars no longer exist in the city today after World War II.  He was honored with the price of water to the poor which the paid at half the price.  During the sear in which the government at the time tried to subtract the entrance of the city of Patras for the profic in which Votsis left after World War I.

Legacy 
He died on 28 October 1917. Votsi Street in Patras, which runs from Karaiskakis Street west to Othonos-Amalias Avenue, was named after him. In 2000, he was honoured with a statue at the end of the street by Othonos-Amalias.

References
The first version of the article is translated and is based from the article at the Greek Wikipedia (el:Main Page)

1841 births
1917 deaths
Mayors of Patras
Politicians from Patras
Greek MPs 1895–1899